The 1987 South Australian National Football League season was the 108th season of the top-level Australian rules football competition in South Australia.

Ladder

1987 SANFL Finals

Week 4 (1987 SANFL Grand Final)

References 

SANFL
South Australian National Football League seasons